"Tracking Treasure Down" is a song recorded by dance music DJs and producers Gabriel & Dresden.  Molly Bancroft collaborated with Josh Gabriel and Dave Dresden on "Tracking Treasure Down", which was a U.S. Hot Dance Club Play number-one single.  She appears in other songs on their 2007 artist album Gabriel & Dresden.

There has been a variety of remixes and releases of "Tracking Treasure Down" which have been mixed by Robbie Rivera, Francis Preve, Dave Seaman and Kyau & Albert. The song has played in clubs and concerts around the world.   The song also features vocals by Gabriel, Dresden, Josh Gabriel's wife Kristy, and his son Rowan.

In March 2013, Gabriel & Dresden released an update to the track titled "Tracking Treasure Down Revisited". The release also includes a remix from Dutch progressive house DJ, Dyro.

Formats and track listings

CD, Maxi Singles
Organized Nature Maxi-single 
Tracking Treasure Down (Gabriel & Dresden Original Mix) - 10:25
Tracking Treasure Down (Robbie Rivera Vocal) - 8:00
Tracking Treasure Down (Robbie Rivera Dub) - 7:59
Tracking Treasure Down (Francis Preve Mix) - 6:37
Tracking Treasure Down (Group Therapy Mix) - 9:18
Tracking Treasure Down (Kyau & Albert Mix) - 7:36
Tracking Treasure Down (Gabriel & Dresden Low Tech Mix) - 6:11
Tracking Treasure Down (Gabriel & Dresden Mixshow Edit) - 6:49
Tracking Treasure Down (Gabriel & Dresden Radio Edit) - 3:06
Tracking Treasure Down (Gabriel & Dresden Extended Radio Mix) - 4:07
Tracking Treasure Down (Gabriel & Dresden Low Tech Radio Edit) - 3:48
Tracking Treasure Down (Acappella) - 3:35

iTunes Maxi-single
Tracking Treasure Down (Gabriel & Dresden Club Mix) - 10:19
Tracking Treasure Down (Gabriel & Dresden Dub) - 9:15
Tracking Treasure Down (Robbie Rivera Vox Mix) - 7:59
Tracking Treasure Down (Robbie Rivera Dub) - 7:52
Tracking Treasure Down (Dave Seaman's Group Therapy Mix) - 9:18
Tracking Treasure Down (Gabriel & Dresden Extended Radio Edit) - 4:06
Tracking Treasure Down (Francis Preve Mix) - 6:37

Central Station Maxi-single 
Tracking Treasure Down (Gabriel & Dresden Radio Edit) - 3:09
Tracking Treasure Down (Gabriel & Dresden Extended Radio Mix) - 4:05
Tracking Treasure Down (Gabriel & Dresden Low Tech Radio Edit) - 3:50
Tracking Treasure Down (Gabriel & Dresden Mixshow Edit) - 6:44
Tracking Treasure Down (Francis Preve Mix) - 6:38
Tracking Treasure Down (Gabriel & Dresden Club Mix) - 10:18
Tracking Treasure Down (Gabriel & Dresden Low Tech Mix) - 5:58
Tracking Treasure Down (Kyau & Albert Mix) - 7:35
Tracking Treasure Down (Group Therapy Mix) - 9:17
Tracking Treasure Down (Robbie Rivera Vocal Mix) - 8:01
Tracking Treasure Down (Robbie Rivera Dub) - 7:50

12" Vinyl

Armind 12" Vinyl 
Tracking Treasure Down (Original Mix) - 3:06
Tracking Treasure Down (Kyau & Albert Mix) - 3:06
Tracking Treasure Down (Group Therapy Remix) - 3:06

Organized Nature 12" Vinyl 
Tracking Treasure Down (Gabriel & Dresden's Original Mix) - 10:19
Tracking Treasure Down (Robbie Rivera Dub) - 7:52

Organized Nature 12" Vinyl 
Tracking Treasure Down (Robbie Rivera Vocal Remix) - 8:00
Tracking Treasure Down (Group Therapy Remix) - 9:18

Retrobyte Remixes 
Tracking Treasure Down (Retrobyte’s Round Two Vocal Mix)
Tracking Treasure Down (Retrobyte Dub)

Vendetta Records 
Tracking Treasure Down (Gabriel & Dresden Original Mix)
Tracking Treasure Down (Gabriel & Dresden Disappear Dub)

Personnel
Additional Vocals - Rowan Gabriel
Additional Keyboards - Molly Bancroft
Backing Vocals - Dave Dresden and Josh Gabriel
Handclaps - Josh Gabriel and Molly Bancroft
Lead Vocals - Molly Bancroft
Written By - Dave Dresden, Josh Gabriel and Molly Bancroft

Instruments

Computers
Apple Cinema Display monitor, Mac G5 dual 2
GHz with 2.5 GB of RAM, PowerBook G4

Console/mixer, interfaces
Behringer MX1604 mixer
M-Audio FireWire 410 mobile recording interface
MOTU 828mkII interface

Drum machine, turntables, DJ mixer
Pioneer CDJ-1000s CD turntables, DJM-909 mixer
Roland TR-909 drum machine
Technics SL-1200 turntables

Mic, mic preamp, compressor
 Studio Projects T3 tube mic
 Summit Audio TLA-50 tube compressor
 Grace 101 mic preamp

Monitors
 Mackie HR824 monitors, HRS120 subwoofer

Synths, modules, software and plug-ins, instruments
 Ableton Live 5 software
 Apple Logic Pro 7 software
 Custom metal bell plates
 Fender Jazz Bass, Stratocaster guitar
 IK Multimedia Sonik Synth soft synth
 Moog Minimoog Voyager synth
 Native Instruments Reaktor soft synth
 Ohm Force Fromage plug-in
 Prosoniq NorthPole Resonant Filter plug-in
 Roland SH-101 synth
 Sequential Circuits Prophet-600 synth
 Spectrasonics Atmosphere, Trilogy and Stylus RMX soft synths
 Takamine acoustic guitar
 Tuned log drum
 Waves L1 and L2 plug-ins

See also
 List of number-one dance singles of 2006 (U.S.)

References

External links
Remix Magazine
[ Billboard.com]
[ Billboard Chart]

2006 singles
2006 songs
Songs written by Josh Gabriel